The Willimantic River is a tributary of the Shetucket River, approximately 25 mi (40 km) long in northeastern Connecticut in the New England region of the United States.

It is formed in northern Tolland County, near Stafford Springs by the confluence of Middle River and Furnace Brook. It flows south to the city of Willimantic, where it joins the Natchaug River to form the Shetucket. It is joined by the Hop River on the Coventry, Columbia, and Windham town border.

Name 
The word Willimantic is of Algonquian origin, either Mohegan-Pequot or Narragansett. It is commonly translated as "land of the swift running water", but the word more likely originally meant "place near the evergreen swamp". The word was first attested in English writing as Waramanticut in 1684, and later as Wallamanticuk, Wewemantic and Weammantuck before being standardized as Willimantic.

Geography 
Shortly upstream from its confluence with the Natchaug, the Willimantic experiences a drop of ninety feet in one mile. The river powered textile mills from Stafford Springs to Willimantic, including the American Thread Company mill. None of these mills are operating as of 2007, having all been destroyed or converted to other uses such as apartment space.

A popular long paddling route begins south of Stafford Springs along Route 32 where the river is mostly quickwater all of the way to the flatwater of Eagleville Pond.  The remainder is fairly easy going to the take-out at Route 66.  Beware of the dam at the Route 275 bridge.  Other access points may be at the N. River Road bridge, the Route 74 bridge, the Depot Rd bridge, the Route 195 bridge, the Jones Crossing bridge, the Merrow Road bridge, the U.S. Route 44 bridge, Brigham bridge, near the Route 275 dam, the Depot Rd bridge, the Route 31 bridge, and the Flanders Rd bridge.

Crossings

See also

List of Connecticut rivers

References

External links
Meet the Willimantic River
Connecticut Explorer's Guide Online paddling map of the Willimantic River.

Rivers of Windham County, Connecticut
Rivers of Tolland County, Connecticut
Connecticut placenames of Native American origin
Windham, Connecticut
Willimantic, Connecticut
Rivers of Connecticut
Tributaries of the Thames River (Connecticut)